John Howie may refer to:

John Howie (biographer) (1735–1793), Scottish writer
John Mackintosh Howie (1936–2011), Scottish mathematician
John Howie (businessman) (1833–1895), industrialist and investor